The 2012 elections for the Oregon Legislative Assembly determined the composition of both houses for the 77th Oregon Legislative Assembly. The Republican and Democratic primary elections were on May 15, 2012, and the general election was on November 6, 2012. Sixteen of the Oregon State Senate's 30 seats were up for election, as were all 60 seats of the Oregon House of Representatives.

In the Senate, the Democrats kept a 16–14 majority, identical to their advantage in the previous legislative session. In the House, Democrats took a 34–26 majority, up from a 30–30 split in the previous session.

Oregon Senate

In the previous session, Democrats controlled the Senate with a 16–14 majority. Of the 16 seats up for election, eight were previously held by Democrats, and eight by Republicans.

Open seats
District 2: Republican Jason Atkinson retired.
 District 5: Democrat Joanne Verger retired.
 District 27:  Republican Chris Telfer was defeated in the District 27 primary by Tim Knopp, the vice president of the Central Oregon Builders Association and a former state Representative.
 District 29: Republican David Nelson retired.

Results

House of Representatives
In the House, all 60 seats up for re-election. In the previous session, the house was evenly split between Democrats and Republicans, 30–30.

Open seats
District 9: Democrat Arnie Roblan won an open state senate seat in District 5.
District 10: Democrat Jean Cowan retired.
District 12: Democrat Terry Beyer retired.
District 26: Republican Matt Wingard won the Republican primary, but dropped his re-election bid following a scandal.
 District 36: Democrat Mary Nolan ran unsuccessfully for a seat on the Portland City Council.
District 40: Democratic Dave Hunt ran unsuccessfully for chairman of the Clackamas County Board of County Commissioners.
District 47: Democratic Jefferson Smith ran unsuccessfully for Mayor of Portland.
District 48: Democrat Mike Schaufler lost in the Democratic primary to Jeff Reardon.
 District 56: Republican Bill Garrard retired.

Results

See also 
 76th Oregon Legislative Assembly (2011–2012)
 77th Oregon Legislative Assembly (2013–2014)

Sources 
Oregon Secretary of State - November 6, 2012, General Election Abstract of Votes

References

Legislative
2012
Oregon Legislative Assembly